Melbourne Water is a Victorian Government-owned statutory authority that controls and manages much of the water bodies and supplies in metropolitan Melbourne, Victoria, Australia, including the reservoirs, lakes, wetlands, canals and urban creeks, and the sewerage and drainage systems that services the city.

Melbourne Water was formed by the merger of Melbourne and Metropolitan Board of Works and a number of smaller urban water authorities in 1992. Melbourne Water primarily operates under the Water Industry Act 1994 and the Water Act 1989.

Overview 
Melbourne Water is wholly owned by the Victorian State Government. It manages Melbourne's water supply catchments, sewage, rivers and major drainage systems throughout the Port Phillip and Westernport region.

Governance of Melbourne Water is by an independent Board of Directors in conjunction with the Minister for Water.

Melbourne Water supplies water to the metropolitan retail water businesses (namely, City West Water, South East Water and Yarra Valley Water), other water authorities, local councils and the land development industry. The Victorian Water Industry Association (VicWater) is the peak industry association for water companies in Victoria.

In 1994, Melbourne Parks and Waterways was separated from Melbourne Water, and became part of Parks Victoria in 1996.

Victorian Desalination Plant 
The Victorian Desalination Plant is a A$3.1 billion desalination plant that was built in the Wonthaggi region of the Bass Coast. The plant can provide an additional 150 gigalitres of water each year. The base fee payable to the owner of the plant, even if no water is ordered, is $608 million a year, or $1.8 million per day, for 27 years. being between $18 and $19 billion in total. On 1 April each year, the Minister for Water places an order for the following financial year, up to 150 gigalitres a year, at an additional cost to Melbourne Water and consumers.

Northern Sewerage Project 
Northern Sewerage Project is a major infrastructure project to increase the capacity of the sewerage system in Melbourne's growing northern suburbs. It will also help protect the Merri and Moonee Ponds Creeks by virtually eliminating sewage overflows that can occur after heavy rain.

Water restrictions 

Melbourne Water has a system of restrictions to manage water supplies into the future. It reports on  storage levels on Thursday each week while an interactive graph compares actual use. Further reviews of restrictions were needed to counter an ongoing drought, poor rainfall, record low storage levels and rising water use compared with past years.

Infrastructure 
The water supply system operated and managed by Melbourne Water comprises:

 catchments covering more than 140,000 hectares.
 ten major storage reservoirs with a capacity of 1,810,500 megalitres.
 64 service reservoirs that provide short-term storage.
 about 1300 kilometres of distribution mains and aqueducts.
 18 water pumping stations, used to pump water from low-lying areas to higher areas.
 five water filtration plants.
 49 water treatment (disinfection) plants.

Water storages 

Melbourne Water manages the ten Melbourne reservoirs. The total storage capacity is 1,810,500 megalitres.

Water supply catchments 
Around 80% of Melbourne's water is sourced from uninhabited forests in the Yarra Ranges and Central Highlands. In excess of 1,570 square kilometres is reserved for water catchment. These forests primarily consist of Mountain Ash. Catchment areas have been closed to the public for over 100 years .

In addition to the reservoirs in the table above, water is harvested via a number of diversion weirs:

 

Clearfell logging is permitted in the Yarra Tributaries and Thomson catchment areas.  Some studies claims this reduces Melbourne's water supply arguing that young regrowth forest uses more water than existing forest Some environmental groups claim that up to 30 thousand megalitres of water could be saved per annum by phasing out logging. This represents 6% of Melbourne's annual usage.

See also 
 Water management in Victoria
 Lakes and Reservoirs in Melbourne
 List of reservoirs and dams in Australia
 Western Treatment Plant
 Eastern Treatment Plant
 Australasian Fire and Emergency Service Authorities Council

External links

Melbourne Water
Yarra Valley Water
South East Water
City West Water
Victorian Water Industry Association (VicWater)

References

Organisations based in Melbourne
Water companies of Victoria (Australia)
1992 establishments in Australia
Government agencies established in 1992